Economic Botany is a quarterly peer-reviewed academic journal that covers all aspects of economic botany. The editor-in-chief is Robert A. Voeks (California State University, Fullerton). The journal was established in 1947 and is published by Springer Science+Business Media and the New York Botanical Garden Press on behalf of the Society for Economic Botany. Authors have a choice to publish articles under the traditional subscription model or an Open Access model.

Abstracting and indexing 
The journal is abstracted and indexed in:

According to the Journal Citation Reports, the journal has a 2020 impact factor of 1.731.

References

External links

Society for Economic Botany

Economic botany
Botany journals
Quarterly journals
Springer Science+Business Media academic journals
Publications established in 1947
English-language journals
Academic journals associated with learned and professional societies